Arnaut de Cumenges (fl. 1218–1246) was a Gascon nobleman, the brother of Count Bernard IV of Comminges. He took part in the war against Albigensian Crusade, participating in the defence of Toulouse in 1218. He was also a troubadour, who wrote a sirventes beginning Be·m plai us usatges. He was still living in 1246.

Works
Be·m plai us usatges ("I'm pleased by usages that run"), translated by James H. Donaldson (2003)

References
Jeanroy, Alfred. La poésie lyrique des troubadours. Toulouse: Privat. 1934.

Gascons
Occitan nobility
13th-century French troubadours
People of the Albigensian Crusade